"Tell the Girl" is a song recorded by Canadian country music artist Duane Steele. It was released in 1997 as the first single from his second studio album, This Is the Life. It peaked at number 9 on the RPM Country Tracks chart in December 1997.

Chart performance

References

1997 songs
1997 singles
Duane Steele songs
Mercury Records singles
Songs written by Duane Steele